Reggae Got Soul is an album by the Jamaican reggae group Toots and the Maytals, released in July 1976 by Island Records.

Critical reception 
Reviewing in Christgau's Record Guide: Rock Albums of the Seventies (1981), Robert Christgau wrote: "In Toots the physical voice is all but equivalent to the artistic 'voice,' the way that term is applied to poets sometimes, and all its warmth, humor, and vivacity come through here. But what has made Toots doubly impressive is the amazing hit songs his voice was attached to. For starters: 'Sweet and Dandy,' '5446 Was My Number,' 'Monkey Man,' and 'African Doctor.' None of these has been released on an American Maytals album, and nothing on this album, not even 'Rasta Man' or 'True Love Is Hard to Find,' equals any of them."

The title track was released a single in Jamaica and the US in 1975 and in the UK in 1976.

Track listing
All songs written by Frederick "Toots" Hibbert except as indicated.

Side one
 "Rasta Man" – 5:56
 "Premature" – 3:11	
 "So Bad" – 2:57	
 "Six And Seven Books" – 3:30
 "I Shall Sing" (Van Morrison) – 2:41

Side two
 "Reggae Got Soul" (Warwick Lyn) – 3:08	
 "Everybody Needs Lovin" – 3:10	
 "Living In The Ghetto" – 3:40	
 "True Love Is Hard To Find" – 4:14	
 "Never You Change" – 3:11

Charts

Personnel

Musicians
 Frederick "Toots" Hibbert – vocals
 Ralphus "Raleigh" Gordon – vocals
 Nathaniel "Jerry" Matthias – vocals
 Dudu Pukwana, Ray Allen – alto saxophone
 Jackie Jackson – bass
 Paul Douglas – drums
 "Chicago Steve" (track B1, B2) – harmonica
 Lynford "Hux" Brown, Junior Kerr – lead guitar 
 Jean Alain Roussel – Hammond B3, keyboards
 Emmanuel Rentzos, Pablo Black (track A1), Sonny Binns, Steve Winwood (track B3), Winston Wright – organ
 Fitzroy "Brother" James, Bruce Rowland, Denzil Laing, Tony Uter – percussion
 Gladstone Anderson, Steve Winwood (track A2) – piano
 Earl "Chinna" Smith, Radcliffe "Dougie" Bryan, Willie Lindo – rhythm guitar
 George Lee, Tommy McCook – tenor saxophone
 Jerome Francis, Rico Rodriguez – trombone
 Bobby Ellis, Eddie Quansah – trumpet

Technical
 Eckford/Stimpson – design
 John Burns, Ronald Logan, Sylvan Morris – engineers
 John Burns, Keith Harwood – mixer
 Larry Cohen, Marilyn Rickard, Roberto Morrison – photography

References

1976 albums
Toots and the Maytals albums
Albums produced by Chris Blackwell
Albums produced by Joe Boyd
Island Records albums